John Addo Kufuor, also known as Chief Kufuor is a Ghanaian businessman and the son of the former president, John Kufuor.

He worked as a management consultant and senior manager at PricewaterhouseCoopers, Africa Office from January 2002.

In 2006, he and his father were cleared of corruption in the purchase of a hotel in Accra. In April 2016, he was listed in a leaked confidential document revealing his use of tax havens in Panama to hide his wealth.

References

Year of birth missing (living people)
Living people
Ghanaian businesspeople
Children of national leaders
People named in the Panama Papers